Tufted Puffin Rock (Russian: Остров Топорков, Ostrov Toporkov) is a flat, rocky islet of the Commander Islands in the North Pacific Ocean, east of the Kamchatka Peninsula in Eastern Russia. These islands belong to the Kamchatka Krai of the Russian Federation. The islet gets its name from the Tufted puffins that use the islet as a breeding ground.

References

Islands of Kamchatka Krai